The Tambora bent-toed gecko (Cyrtodactylus tambora) is a species of gecko that is endemic to Sumbawa in Indonesia.

References 

Cyrtodactylus
Reptiles described in 2017